The Stallion range of trucks is produced by Vehicle Factory Jabalpur (VFJ) of Armoured Vehicles Nigam Limited (previously Ordnance Factory Board) for the Indian Armed Forces.

The Stallion forms the logistical backbone of the Indian Armed Forces, with over 60,000 Stallions used by the Indian Army and several thousand are used by ITBP. Stallions in a wide range of configurations were in active service with the Indian Army as of 2010. The Stallions have replaced the erstwhile workhorses of the Armed Forces, the Shaktiman trucks, which has been phased out.

History
On August 10, 1998, a license was granted by AL to produce the Stallion Mk III at VFJ or any other Ordnance Factory facility.

Design

The Stallion is a medium-duty defence vehicle of the Indian Army with multiple logistical and tactical applications.

Variants

Super Stallion 

The Super Stallion is an upgraded version of the Stallion. The 6x6 is rated at 10 tonnes while the 8x8 is rated at 12 tonnes.

Stallion Kavach

Ashok Leyland has developed an armored personnel carrier of the 4x4 Stallion.

Field Artillery Tractor

Field Artillery Tractor is a variant developed for towing heavy artillery guns on 6×6 platform.

Foreign Variants

The French built Panhard TC54 is an Ashok Leyland Stallion but with an Austrian Steyr diesel engine and a Czech transmission built for a Saudi-Chinese 155mm towed artillery programme. 50 were delivered to Saudi Arabia and 80 to Togo.

Manufacture
The Stallion is manufactured by the Vehicle Factory Jabalpur (VFJ) of Ordnance Factory Board.

The Stallion is designed for reliability, high mobility, off-road tactical capabilities and protection. It is built for use in harsh environments and for easy maintenance in regions where supporting infrastructure may be missing.

Ashok leyland defence systems (ALDS) provides a complete package to customers along with options such as Fleet Management System, maintenance kits, training packages, electronic publications along with global warehouse support.

Vehicle configurations
The Stallion range offers various driveline configurations and standard bodies for each configuration. All base variants are
available in right hand drive or left hand drive, manual or automatic transmission and armoured or non-armoured cabins. Ashok Leyland Defence also offers Stallion kits to various manufacturers who sell armoured vehicles and Mine Protected Vehicles (MPV).

The standard troop carrying/cargo-type platform body is fitted with steel drop sides, a single-piece drop tailgate, and a removable tarpaulin and bows. An optional feature includes a torsion-free body.

The Stallion chassis has been adapted into a wide range of variants, including: Troop Carrier with Armoured Cab, Troop Carrier, Troop Carrier with Crane, Fuel Bowser, Water Bowser, Recovery Vehicle, ISO Container / Twist Locks, Fire Fighting Trucks, Tipper, MPV Kits.

Operators
 - 60,000.
 - 50 Panhard TC54, a derivative of Stallion.
 80 Panhard TC54.
  - Stallion 6x6

 -633

References

External links
 Stallion and Super Stallion trucks

Military trucks of India
Ashok Leyland Defence Systems trucks